The Doeberl Cup is an annual chess tournament held in Canberra, Australia. It has been held every year since 1963 (apart from 2020) and is the longest running weekend chess event in Australia. Since its inception the event has grown both larger and stronger, and often attracts more players than the Australian Chess Championships.

The tournament is held each year over Easter. The tournament runs in 4 sections, with the top section known as the Doeberl Cup Premier. Grandmaster Ian Rogers holds the record for the most wins (either outright or on tie-break) with 12.

The Doeberl Cup was named after its primary sponsor, Erich Doeberl, and, after an interregnum following Doeberl's death, in recent years sponsorship has continued through his daughter Rosemary.

Winners
1963 John Purdy
1964 Cecil Purdy
1965 Bill Geus
1966 Bill Geus
1967 John Kellner
1968 Ken Hill
1969 Doug Hamilton
1970 Cecil Purdy, Terrey Shaw, Fred Flatow
1971 Terrey Shaw
1972 Fred Flatow
1973 Anthony Wiedenhofer
1974 Maxwell Fuller
1975 Maxwell Fuller
1976 Robert Murray Jamieson
1977 Philip Viner
1978 Robert Murray Jamieson
1979 Fred Flatow
1980 Ian Rogers
1981 Ian Rogers
1982 Greg Hjorth
1983 Maxwell Fuller
1984 Ian Rogers
1985 Greg Hjorth
1986 Ian Rogers
1987 Greg Hjorth
1988 Larry Christiansen (USA)
1989 Ian Rogers
1990 Ian Rogers
1991 Ketevan Arakhamia (GEO)
1992 Tony Miles (ENG)
1993 Ian Rogers
1994 Darryl Johansen
1995 Ian Rogers
1996 Darryl Johansen
1997 Ian Rogers
1998 Michael Gluzman
1999 Darryl Johansen
2000 Aleksandar Wohl
2001 Darryl Johansen
2002 David Smerdon
2003 Ian Rogers
2004 Zong-Yuan Zhao
2005 Ian Rogers, Aleksander Wohl
2006 Igor Goldenberg
2007 Ian Rogers
2008 Varuzhan Akobian (USA)
2009 Deep Sengupta (IND)
2010 Li Chao (CHN)
2011 Andrei Deviatkin (RUS)
2012 Adam Horvath (HUN)
2013 Li Chao (CHN)
2014 Liviu-Dieter Nisipeanu (GER)
2015 Zhou Weiqi (CHN)
2016 James Morris
2017 Surya Ganguly (IND)
2018 Timur Gareyev (USA)
2019 Hrant Melkumyan (ARM)
2021 Justin Tan
2022 Hrant Melkumyan (ARM)

All players are Australian unless indicated otherwise.
With the exceptions of 1970 and 2005, only outright winners or winners on tie-break are listed.

Trivia
Lloyd Fell played in every Doeberl Cup from its inception in 1963 until 2008.

See also

References

External links
 Official Website
 Canberra Times article on the 2014 Cup

Chess competitions
Chess in Australia
1963 in chess
Recurring events established in 1963